The rufous-fronted babbler (Cyanoderma rufifrons) is a babbler species in the Old World babbler family.

It is buff-brown with paler brown underparts and a dull rufous crown. Its upper wings, tail, supercilium and lores are whitish-grey. Its song is a high-pitched tuh tuh-tuh-tuh-tuh-tuh.

Stachyris rufifrons was the scientific name proposed by Allan Octavian Hume in 1873 who described a small babbler from the Pegu Range in Myanmar that was pale brown, had a rufous-coloured head and white lores.
Stachyrhidopsis rufifrons ambigua was proposed as a subspecies by Herbert Hasting Harington in 1914 for a rufous-fronted babbler with yellow lores, probably occurring in Sikkim, Bhutan Dooars and northeast India.
The rufous-fronted babbler was later placed in the genus Stachyridopsis.

Stachyris rodolphei was proposed by Herbert Girton Deignan in 1939 for three babbler specimens collected at Doi Chiang Dao in Thailand. It is considered synonymous with the rufous-fronted babbler.

References

External links 

rufous-fronted babbler
Birds of Eastern Himalaya
Birds of East India
Birds of Southeast Asia
Birds of Yunnan
rufous-fronted babbler
Taxonomy articles created by Polbot